Norton Strange Townshend (December 25, 1815July 13, 1895) was an American physician and politician who served on term as a United States representative from Ohio from 1851 to 1853.

Biography
Born in Clay Coton, Northamptonshire, England, in 1830 he migrated to the United States with his parents, who settled in Avon, Ohio. He educated himself by the use of his father's library, taught a district school for a short time, and was graduated from the Columbia University College of Physicians and Surgeons in New York in 1840.

Townshend was a delegate to the World's Anti-Slavery Convention in London in 1840, but he was not included in the commemorative painting with other important delegates. He studied medicine in the hospitals of London, Paris, Edinburgh, and Dublin, and in 1841 engaged in the practice of medicine in Avon, Ohio. He moved to Elyria, Ohio, and was a member of the Ohio House of Representatives in 1848 and 1849. He was a delegate to the State constitutional convention in 1850 and was elected as a Democrat to the Thirty-second Congress (March 4, 1851 – March 3, 1853).

In 1854 and 1855, Townshend was a member of the Ohio Senate and during the American Civil War was a medical inspector of the Union Army with the rank of lieutenant colonel from 1863 to 1865.

He engaged in agricultural pursuits near Avon, was director of the State board of agriculture from 1858 to 1869 and 1886 to 1889, was professor of agriculture in Iowa Agricultural College in 1869, and was appointed in 1870 as one of the first trustees of Ohio Agricultural and Mechanical College. He resigned in 1873 to become professor of agriculture in the new State college and served until his resignation in 1892 when he became professor emeritus. Townshend died in Columbus, Ohio in 1895; interment was in Protestant Cemetery, Avon, Ohio.

The Norton Strange Townshend Family Papers are located at the William L. Clements Library in Ann Arbor, Michigan.

Townshend Hall on the campus of Ohio State University was named for the professor on May 19, 1896.

His descendants include his great-grandson Norton Townshend Dodge, an economist and art collector.

References

"Honest Independence: The Life of Norton Strange Townshend" (online exhibit

External links

1815 births
1895 deaths
People from West Northamptonshire District
People from Elyria, Ohio
Union Army officers
Democratic Party Ohio state senators
Democratic Party members of the Ohio House of Representatives
English emigrants to the United States
Columbia University Vagelos College of Physicians and Surgeons alumni
Ohio Constitutional Convention (1850)
People of Ohio in the American Civil War
Politicians from Columbus, Ohio
Ohio State University trustees
19th-century American physicians
Ohio State University faculty
19th-century American politicians
Democratic Party members of the United States House of Representatives from Ohio